Guðmundur Kristjánsson (born 1 March 1989) is an Icelandic football player, currently playing for Icelandic club Fimleikafélag Hafnarfjarðar, having previously played for Icelandic football club Breiðablik.

Career statistics

References

External links

1989 births
Living people
Gudmundur Kristjansson
Gudmundur Kristjansson
Gudmundur Kristjansson
Gudmundur Kristjansson
Gudmundur Kristjansson
IK Start players
Gudmundur Kristjansson
Eliteserien players
Norwegian First Division players
Gudmundur Kristjansson
Gudmundur Kristjansson
Gudmundur Kristjansson
Association football midfielders
Association football central defenders